The Charles Egeler Reception and Guidance Center (RGC) is a state prison for men located in Jackson, Jackson County, Michigan, owned and operated by the Michigan Department of Corrections.  

RGC houses a maximum of 1382 inmates at a mix of security levels, for the assessment, screening, and classification of all male state prisoners.  RGC is adjacent to portions of the former Michigan State Prison, described as the largest walled prison in the world as late as 1981, when it was rocked by extensive, damaging riots.    The prison was divided in 1988 into smaller institutions.  As of 2016, Parnell and three other local components remain open as prisons:  

 Parnall Correctional Facility, a minimum-security prison
 the G. Robert Cotton Correctional Facility, an educational facility
 the Cooper Street Correctional Facility, a discharge and processing facility

RGC is named after Charles Egeler, warden of the former Michigan State Prison (at the time called the State Prison of Southern Michigan), on the same site. Egeler lived from May 17, 1928, until March 6, 1977. He was hired by the Michigan Department of Corrections in 1953 and became the warden of the State Prison of Southern Michigan in 1972, the position he held until his death.

Notable inmates
"Kenneth Bluew, former Michigan cop who murdered his partner and made it look like a suicide.

References

Prisons in Michigan
Buildings and structures in Jackson County, Michigan
1988 establishments in Michigan